Arklow RFC is an Irish rugby team based in Arklow, County Wicklow, playing in Division 2B of the Leinster League. The club colours are black and red. They have 1st and 2nd Senior team, ladies team the Arklow Amazons, Under 18s,16s,u14s and u12s girls. Under 16s,u15,u14s boys and an array of minis teams.

References
 Arklow Rugby Club
Arklow RFC: Reaping the rewards of youth and mini revamp

Irish rugby union teams
Rugby clubs established in 1936
Rugby union clubs in County Wicklow